Someone Else's America is a 1995 drama film directed by Goran Paskaljević.

The film presents the story of two people, one from Spain, the other from Montenegro, both living in Brooklyn.

The film won the Golden Spike at the Valladolid International Film Festival in 1995.

Cast 
 Tom Conti - Alonso
 Miki Manojlović - Bayo
 María Casares - Alonso's Mother
 Zorka Manojlović - Bayo's Mother
 Sergej Trifunović - Lukas
 José Ramón Rosario - Panchito

References

External links 
 

1995 drama films
1995 films
Films set in the United States
1990s Serbian-language films
1990s English-language films
1995 multilingual films